James Miller Hazlett (October 14, 1864November 8, 1941) was a Republican member of the U.S. House of Representatives from Pennsylvania.

Biography
James Hazlett was born in Derry, Ireland.  At the age of two he immigrated to the United States with his parents who settled in South Philadelphia, Pennsylvania. He began working in his father's blacksmith shop in 1881 and was engaged as a farrier until 1915.  In 1896 he was nominated and elected to the Philadelphia Common Council and served in councils for sixteen years, resigning as president of the select council in 1911.  He also served in a variety of other Philadelphia offices.

He was elected as a Republican to the Seventieth Congress and served until his resignation on October 20, 1927, before the convening of Congress.

He was elected chairman of the Republican Central Campaign Committee in May 1928 and served until 1934. He was a delegate to the Republican National Conventions in 1928 and 1932.  He served as a member of the Board of Road Viewers from November 7, 1935, until he retired on February 23, 1937.

Sources

The Political Graveyard

Philadelphia City Council members
Irish emigrants to the United States (before 1923)
1864 births
1941 deaths
Republican Party members of the United States House of Representatives from Pennsylvania